Rogério Dutra Silva and Andrés Molteni were the defending champions but chose not to defend their title.

Salvatore Caruso and Jonathan Eysseric won the title after defeating Nicolás Kicker and Fabrício Neis 6–3, 6–3 in the final.

Seeds

Draw

References
 Main Draw

Internazionali di Tennis Città di Perugia - Doubles
2017 Doubles